Real Valladolid Club de Fútbol Promesas is the reserve team of Real Valladolid, a Spanish football club based in Valladolid, in the autonomous community of Castile and León. Founded in 1942, currently plays in Segunda Federación – Group 1, holding home games at the Ciudad Deportiva del Real Valladolid, which seats 1,500 spectators.

History

Team names
 Recreativo Europa Delicias - (1942–73)
 Real Valladolid Promesas - (1973–90)
 Real Valladolid B - (1990–2019)
 Real Valladolid Promesas - (2019–)

Season to season
 As a farm team

 As a reserve team

 1 season in Primera División RFEF
 20 seasons in Segunda División B
1 season in Segunda Federación
 42 seasons in Tercera División

Honours
 Tercera División: (7) 1954-55, 1980–81, 1981–82, 1982–83, 1990–91, 2011–12, 2013–14

Current squad
.

From Youth Academy

Out on loan

Current technical staff

Notable former players

References

External links
 Real Valladolid official website 
 Futbolme team profile 
 Blanquivioletas, fansite 
 Pucelanos, fansite 

Football clubs in Castile and León
Spanish reserve football teams
 
Association football clubs established in 1942
1942 establishments in Spain
Primera Federación clubs
Sport in Valladolid